The Drum Battle – Gene Krupa and Buddy Rich at JATP (later issued as The Original Drum Battle!) is a 1960 live album by drummers Gene Krupa and Buddy Rich, recorded at a Jazz at the Philharmonic concert at Carnegie Hall in 1952.

Reception

Lindsay Planer writing on Allmusic wrote of the opening tracks that "While Smith drives the band, Krupa is front and center with his antagonistic percussive prodding. 'Idaho' is marked with Jones' rollicking post-bop mastery as he trades solos with Smith and can be heard quoting lines from Monk before yielding to Smith. The cover of Duke Ellington's 'Sophisticated Lady' sparkles from beginning to end. Jones' opening flourish sets the tenure as Smith settles into a smoky lead, containing some nice syncopation and regal augmentation from Jones. ...The tempo is significantly stepped up on a cover of Benny Goodman's 'Flying Home,' which is full of high-spirited playing and garners a sizable reaction from the audience." Planer described Fitzgerald's performance on "Perdido" as "hot steppin' and definitive" and said it featured "authority, class, and most of all, soul". Rich and Krupa's performance on The Drum Battle was described by Planer as a "mile-a-minute wash of profound percussion".

Track listing 
 "Idaho" (Jesse Stone) – 7:26
 "Sophisticated Lady" (Duke Ellington, Irving Mills, Mitchell Parish) – 4:35
 "Flying Home" (Benny Goodman, Lionel Hampton) – 6:02
 "Drum Boogie" (Gene Krupa, Roy Eldridge) – 9:20
 "The Drum Battle" (Norman Shrudlu) – 3:20
 "Perdido" (Ervin Drake, Hans J. Langsfelder, Juan Tizol) – 3:30

Personnel 
 Gene Krupa – drums
 Buddy Rich – drums
 Roy Eldridge – trumpet
 Charlie Shavers – trumpet
 Benny Carter – alto saxophone
 Flip Phillips – tenor saxophone
 Lester Young – tenor saxophone
 Hank Jones – piano
 Oscar Peterson – piano
 Barney Kessel – guitar
 Ray Brown – double bass
 Ella Fitzgerald – vocals

Production
 Leonard Feather – liner notes
 Chuck Stewart – photography
 Norman Granz – record producer

References 

1960 live albums
Albums produced by Norman Granz
Albums recorded at Carnegie Hall
Buddy Rich live albums
Gene Krupa live albums
Verve Records live albums